Viens may refer to:

 Viens, Vaucluse, a commune in the department of Vaucluse in France
Viens (surname)
 Viens, album by Ève Angeli
 Viens, 1997 album by Fēlikss Ķiģelis
 "Viens", song by Danyel Gérard

See also 
 Vein (disambiguation)